The stability–instability paradox is an international relations theory regarding the effect of nuclear weapons and mutually assured destruction. It states that when two countries each have nuclear weapons, the probability of a direct war between them greatly decreases, but the probability of minor or indirect conflicts between them increases. This occurs because rational actors want to avoid nuclear wars, and thus they neither start major conflicts nor allow minor conflicts to escalate into major conflicts—thus making it safe to engage in minor conflicts. For instance, during the Cold War the United States and the Soviet Union never engaged each other in warfare, but fought proxy wars in Korea, Vietnam, Angola, the Middle East, Nicaragua and Afghanistan and spent substantial amounts of money and manpower on gaining relative influence over the third world.

A study published in the Journal of Conflict Resolution in 2009 quantitatively evaluated the nuclear peace hypothesis, and found support for the existence of the stability–instability paradox. The study determined that while nuclear weapons promote strategic stability, and prevent large scale wars, they simultaneously allow for more lower intensity conflicts. When one state has nuclear weapons, but their opponent does not, there is a greater chance of war. In contrast, when there is mutual nuclear weapon ownership with both states possessing nuclear weapons, the odds of war drop precipitously.

This effect can be seen in the India–Pakistan relationship and to some degree in Russia–NATO relations.

Mechanism
The stability–instability paradox

Assumptions
One of the major assumptions in the concept of mutually assured destruction and the stability-instability phenomenon as its consequence is that all actors are rational and that this rationality implies an avoidance of complete destruction. Particularly the second part of the assumption might not necessarily be given in real-world politics. When imagining a theocratic nation whose leaders believe in the existence of an afterlife which they assume to be sufficiently better than our current life, it becomes rational for them to do everything in their power to facilitate a swift transition for as many people as possible into that afterlife. This connection between certain religious beliefs and politics of weapons of mass destruction has been pointed out by some atheists in order to point out perceived dangers of theocratic societies.

See also
 Nuclear peace
 Minimal deterrence
 Deterrence theory

References

International relations theory
Paradoxes